Air is a lead or bronze sculpture, by Aristide Maillol.

He modeled Dina Vierny in plaster in 1938, and casts were made after his death. 
It is an edition of six. 
Examples are located at the Kröller-Müller Museum, Yale University Art Gallery, Jardin des Tuileries, J. Paul Getty Museum, Norton Simon Museum, and Kimbell Art Museum.

References

External links 

Artnet.com: Air by Maillol

Sculptures by Aristide Maillol
Sculptures of women
1938 sculptures
Lead sculptures
Nude sculptures
Outdoor sculptures in France
Sculptures in Paris
Outdoor sculptures in Greater Los Angeles
Nude sculptures in California
Sculptures of women in California
Sculptures of the Norton Simon Museum
J. Paul Getty Museum